The Range of the Awful Hand is a range of hills in the Galloway Hills range, part of the Southern Uplands of Scotland. The most westerly of three parallel ridges, the range is neighboured to the east by the Dungeon Hills and the Rhinns of Kells. The Minnigaff Hills also lie southeast. In total, these four ranges are part of the Galloway Forest Park. The ridge is split between South Ayrshire and Dumfries and Galloway.

Hills 
The hills are named due to their resemblance to the fingers of a hand. They are the highest of the Galloway Hills and the Southern Uplands with the highest hill, Merrick, reaching 843 m. There is a considerable (approx. 56 m) difference in height between Merrick and the next highest hill, Kirriereoch Hill; as a result there are a number of hill ranges in the Southern Uplands which would otherwise be higher. The terrain is a mix of both ranges to the east in that the higher, flatter ground is on short grass but the slopes and cols are craggy and occasionally boggy. A number of smaller hills dot the broader, northern side of the ridge as it does not terminate as definitively as the neighbouring ridges.

Ignoring all satellite ridges, from north to south the main hills are:

Ecology 
The range forms part of the Silver Flowe-Merrick Kells Biosphere Reserve, which incorporates a considerable portion of both ranges to the west and east, and is a Natura 2000 site. The area is very popular with invertebrates and swarms of Odonata, Syrphidae and Lepidoptera during summer are common.

Etymology 
The range has a more easily understood name than the adjacent two eastwards and has a more pronounced Scottish Gaelic origin, such as in 'Kirriereoch Hill': ceathramh riabhach (hill of the brindled quarter), 'Merrick': meurag (finger) and 'Benyellary': beinn iolaire (hill of the eagle). The northern hills are more obscure; 'Caerloch Dhu' may derive from the Welsh caer lloch and Scottish Gaelic dhubh (black fort of refuge) and 'Shalloch on Minnoch' (referring to the Water of Minnoch to the west), where 'shalloch' derives from Scottish Gaelic sealghe (hunting) and 'minnoch' derives from meadhonach (middle), ultimately meaning 'hunting hill of the middle burn'. The farm of the same name to the west may borrow from the name of the hill.

References 

Mountains and hills of the Southern Uplands
Mountains and hills of Dumfries and Galloway
Mountains and hills of South Ayrshire